In probability theory and statistics, Campbell's theorem or the Campbell–Hardy theorem is either a particular equation or set of results relating to the expectation of a function summed over a point process to an integral involving the mean measure of the point process, which allows for the calculation of expected value and variance of the random sum. One version of the theorem, also known as Campbell's formula, entails an integral equation for the aforementioned sum over a general point process, and not necessarily  a Poisson point process. There also exist equations involving  moment measures and factorial moment measures that are considered versions of Campbell's formula. All these results are employed in  probability and statistics with a particular importance in the theory of point processes and queueing theory  as well as the related fields stochastic geometry, continuum percolation theory, and spatial statistics.

Another result by the name of Campbell's theorem is specifically for the Poisson point process and gives a method for calculating moments as well as the Laplace functional of a Poisson point process.

The name of both theorems stems from the work by Norman R. Campbell on thermionic noise, also known as shot noise, in vacuum tubes,  which was partly inspired by the work of Ernest Rutherford and Hans Geiger on alpha particle detection, where the Poisson point process arose as a solution to a family of differential equations by Harry Bateman.  In Campbell's work, he presents the moments and generating functions of the random sum of a Poisson process on the real line, but remarks that the main mathematical argument was due to G. H. Hardy, which has inspired the result to be sometimes called the Campbell–Hardy theorem.

Background

where  denotes the expectation and set notation is used such that  is considered as a random set (see Point process notation). For a point process  , Campbell's theorem relates the above expectation with  the intensity measure .

where the measure notation is used such that  is considered a random counting measure. The quantity  can be interpreted as the average number of points of the point process  located in the set B.

First definition: general point process

One version of Campbell's theorem is for a general (not necessarily simple) point process  with intensity measure:

is known as Campbell's formula or Campbell's theorem, which gives a method for calculating expectations of sums of measurable functions  with ranges on the real line.

where if one side of the equation is finite, then so is the other side. This equation is essentially an application of Fubini's theorem and it holds for a wide class of point processes, simple or not. Depending on the integral notation, this  integral may also be written as:

If the intensity measure  of a point process  has a density , then Campbell's formula becomes:

Stationary point process

For a stationary point process  with constant density , Campbell's theorem or formula reduces to a volume integral:

 

This equation naturally holds for the homogeneous Poisson point processes, which is an example of a stationary stochastic process.

Applications: Random sums
Campbell's theorem for general point processes gives a method for calculating the expectation of a function of a point (of a point process) summed over all the points in the point process. These random sums over point processes have applications in many areas where they are used as mathematical models.

Shot noise
Campbell originally studied a problem of random sums motivated by understanding thermionic noise in valves, which is also known as shot-noise. Consequently, the study of random sums of functions over point processes is known as shot noise in probability and, particularly, point process theory.

Interference in wireless networks
In wireless network communication, when a transmitter is trying to send a signal to a receiver, all the other transmitters in the network can be considered as interference, which poses a similar problem as noise does in traditional wired telecommunication networks in terms of the ability to send data based on information theory. If the positioning of the interfering transmitters are assumed to form some point process, then shot noise can be used to model the sum of their interfering signals, which has led to stochastic geometry models of wireless networks.

Generalizations
For general point processes, other more general versions of Campbell's theorem exist depending on the nature of the random sum and in particular the function being summed over the point process.

Functions of multiple points
If the function is a function of more than one point of the point process, the moment measures or factorial moment measures of the point process are needed, which can be compared to moments and factorial of random variables. The type of measure needed depends on whether the points of the point process in the random sum are need to be distinct or may repeat.

Repeating points
Moment measures are used when points are allowed to repeat.

Distinct points
Factorial moment measures are used when points are not allowed to repeat, hence points are distinct.

Functions of points and the point process

For general point processes, Campbell's theorem is only for sums of functions of a single point of the point process. To calculate the sum of a function of a single point as well as the entire point process, then generalized Campbell's theorems are required using the Palm distribution of the point process, which is based on the branch of probability known as Palm theory or Palm calculus.

Second definition: Poisson point process

Another version of Campbell's theorem says that for a Poisson point process  with intensity measure  and a measurable function , the random sum

is absolutely convergent with probability one if and only if the integral

Provided that this integral is finite, then the theorem further asserts that for any complex value  the equation

holds if the integral on the right-hand side converges, which is the case for purely imaginary . Moreover,

and if this integral converges, then

where  denotes the variance of the random sum .

From this theorem some expectation results for the Poisson point process follow, including its  Laplace functional.

Application: Laplace functional

For a Poisson point process  with intensity measure , the Laplace functional is a consequence of the above version of Campbell's theorem and is given by:

which for the homogeneous case is:

Notes

References

Probability theorems